Geoffrey Edward Beck (16 June 1918 – 5 March 2019) was an English first-class cricketer and Congregational minister.

Education
Geoffrey Beck attended Whitgift School from 1928 to 1934, and later studied theology at Mansfield College, Oxford, from 1942 to 1946.

Cricket
A middle-order batsman, he represented Oxford University at cricket, playing in the University Match in 1943 (when he top-scored) and 1945, both of which were one-day matches. When first-class cricket resumed after World War II he played three matches for Oxford, with a highest score of 50 against Surrey in his first match. He later played two matches for Oxfordshire in the Minor Counties Championship in 1951.

Marriage and ministry
Beck married Joy Crookshank, a Cambridge graduate and fellow member of the Student Christian Movement, in 1946. He also began his career as a Congregational minister in 1946. He served as the minister at Eccleston, St Helens, from 1946 to 1950, at Summertown, Oxford, from 1950 to 1965, as Warden of the Chapel of Unity at Coventry Cathedral from 1965 to 1971, and as minister at the Central Free Church, Brighton, from 1971 to 1984.

British-German relations
He was co-founder of the Adam von Trott Memorial Appeal Project in honour of the participant, a former student at Oxford, in the plot to assassinate Hitler in 1944. The appeal provides scholarships to German students to study at Mansfield College. In 2014 the German government awarded Beck the Cross of the Order of Merit for his work for British-German relations.

Retirement and death
Beck lived in retirement in East Sussex and died in March 2019 at the age of 100. His wife died in 2000; they had four children.

See also
Longest-lived first-class cricketers

References

External links
 
 Geoffrey Beck at CricketArchive

1918 births
2019 deaths
People educated at Whitgift School
Alumni of Mansfield College, Oxford
English centenarians
Men centenarians
English Congregationalist ministers
English cricketers
Oxford University cricketers
Oxfordshire cricketers
People from Wisbech
Recipients of the Cross of the Order of Merit of the Federal Republic of Germany
People from Polegate